The 1992–93 Kentucky Wildcats men's basketball team represented University of Kentucky in the 1992–93 NCAA Division I men's basketball season. The head coach was Rick Pitino and the team finished the season with an overall record of 30–4.

Roster

Schedule and results

|-
!colspan=9 style=| Regular Season

|-
!colspan=9 style=| SEC Tournament

|-
!colspan=9 style=| NCAA Tournament

Rankings

Awards and honors
Jamal Mashburn – Consensus First-team All-American, SEC Player of the Year

NBA draft

References 

Kentucky Wildcats men's basketball seasons
Kentucky
NCAA Division I men's basketball tournament Final Four seasons
Wild
Wild
Kentucky